A town or eup is an administrative unit in South Korea; along with township (rural), a town (urban) is one of the divisions of a county, and of some cities with a population of less than 500,000.  The main town or towns in a county—or the secondary town or towns within a city's territory—are designated as towns. Towns are subdivided into villages. In order to form a town, the minimum population required is 20,000.

List of towns in South Korea

Renamed towns

See also 
 Administrative divisions of South Korea

References 

Towns